Guy Forget and Yannick Noah were the defending champions, but lost in the semifinals to Anders Järryd and Tomáš Šmíd.

Järryd and Šmíd won the title by defeating Stanislav Birner and Jaroslav Navrátil 6–4, 6–3 in the final.

Seeds

Draw

References

External links
 Official results archive (ATP)
 Official results archive (ITF)

1987 Grand Prix (tennis)